The United Nations Transitional Authority in Cambodia (UNTAC) was a United Nations peacekeeping operation in Cambodia in 1992–93 formed following the 1991 Paris Peace Accords. This was the first occasion in which the UN directly assumed responsibility for the administration of an outright independent state (the UN did the administration of the former Dutch territory of Netherlands New Guinea between 1962–1963 prior), rather than simply monitoring or supervising the area. The UN transitional authority organised and ran elections, had its own radio station and jail, and was responsible for promoting and safeguarding human rights at the national level.

History 
UNTAC was established in February 1992 under United Nations Security Council Resolution 745 in agreement with the State of Cambodia, the de facto government of the country at that time, to implement the Paris Peace Accords of October 1991. UNTAC was the product of intense diplomatic activity over many years.

Headed by Chief of Mission Yasushi Akashi (Japan), Force Commander Lieutenant-General John Sanderson (Australia), and Police Commissioner
Brigadier-General Klaas Roos (Netherlands), UNTAC involved approximately 15,900 military, 3,400 civilian police, 2,000 civilians and 450 UN Volunteers, as well as locally recruited staff and interpreters. During the electoral period, more than 50,000 Cambodians served as electoral staff and some 900 international polling station officers were seconded from Governments. The whole operation cost over $1.6 billion (equivalent to $2.5 billion in 2017), mostly in salaries for expatriates.

Goals
UNTAC's aim was to restore peace and civil government in a country ruined by decades of civil war and Cold War machinations, to hold free and fair elections leading to a new constitution and to "kick-start" the rehabilitation of the country. It was to exercise 'supervision' or 'supervision or control' over all aspects of government, including foreign affairs, national defence, finance, public security and information, and to supervise, monitor and verify the withdrawal and non-return of foreign military forces. 

Its mission was also to canton, disarm and demobilise Cambodia's fighting factions, confiscate caches of weapons and military supplies, promote and protect human rights, oversee military security and maintain law and order, repatriate and resettle refugees and displaced persons, assist in mine clearance and the establishment of training programmes in mine clearance and mine awareness, rehabilitate essential infrastructure and assist in economic reconstruction and development.

Another important goal was the trial of senior Khmer Rouge leaders. The process that was initiated during the UNTAC led on 4 October 2004, to the ratification of an agreement with the United Nations by the Cambodian National Assembly on the establishment of a tribunal to try senior leaders responsible for the atrocities committed by the Khmer Rouge. Donor countries pledged the $43 million international share of the three-year tribunal budget, while the Cambodian government's share of the budget was $13.3 million.
The first trials of senior Khmer Rouge leaders took place only in 2007, when many of them were already dead or in ill-health.

Disarmament

Despite UNTAC's boasting of its effectiveness and being feted by the international community as a success, UNTAC failed to disarm the Khmer Rouge, while effectively disarming the SOC's local militias. This bias allowed the Khmer Rouge to make territorial gains and gave rise to political violence. The State of Cambodia's military leaders were furious, claiming that UNTAC was extremely exacting with the disarmament of the CPAF, but too lenient and ineffective when it came to disarm the Khmer Rouge.

1993 elections
Over 4 million Cambodians (about 90% of eligible voters) participated in the May 1993 elections, although the Khmer Rouge or Party of Democratic Kampuchea (PDK), whose forces were never actually disarmed or demobilised, barred some people from participating. Prince Ranariddh's FUNCINPEC Party was the top vote recipient with a 45.5% vote, followed by Hun Sen's Cambodian People's Party and the Buddhist Liberal Democratic Party, respectively. FUNCINPEC then entered into a coalition with the other parties that had participated in the election.

The parties represented in the 120-member assembly proceeded to draft and approve a new constitution, which was promulgated 24 September 1993. It established a multiparty liberal democracy in the framework of a constitutional monarchy, with the former Prince Sihanouk elevated to King. Prince Ranariddh and Hun Sen became First and Second Prime Ministers, respectively, in the Royal Cambodian Government (RGC). The constitution provides for a wide range of internationally recognised human rights.

Participating countries

The 46 participating countries providing military observers, police, or troops were:

Criticism 
Norodom Sihanouk had reservations about the UNTAC operation. The massive presence of foreign troops led to the abuse of some Cambodian women, boosting prostitution and possibly driving a spike in the prevalence of HIV/AIDS by introducing the virus from other affected countries. The number of sex workers in the State of Cambodia rose from about 6,000 in 1991, to over 20,000 after the arrival of UNTAC personnel in 1992. By 1995 there were between 50,000 and 90,000 Cambodians affected by AIDS according to a WHO estimate.

Statistics 
 Duration: March 1992 – September 1993
 Strength: Approximately 22,000 military and civilian personnel
 Fatalities: 78 (4 military observers, 41 other military personnel, 14 civilian police, 5 international civilian staff and 14 local staff).
 Expenditures: US$1.62 billion (UNAMIC and UNTAC combined)

See also 

 UN protectorate

Further reading 

 Strangio, Sebastian. 2014. Hun Sen’s Cambodia. Yale University Press.

Notes

References

External links 
 Records of the United Nations Transitional Authority in Cambodia (UNTAC) (1992-1993) at the United Nations Archives 
 Untac.com: UNTAC website

Former countries in Cambodian history
745
1990s in Cambodia
States and territories established in 1992
States and territories disestablished in 1993
1992 establishments in Cambodia
1993 disestablishments in Cambodia
20th century in Cambodia
Cambodia and the United Nations